Abbas Talebi (born 31 December 1967) is an Iranian weightlifter. He competed in the men's middleweight event at the 1992 Summer Olympics.

References

External links
 

1967 births
Living people
Iranian male weightlifters
Olympic weightlifters of Iran
Weightlifters at the 1992 Summer Olympics
Place of birth missing (living people)
Weightlifters at the 1986 Asian Games
Weightlifters at the 1994 Asian Games
Asian Games competitors for Iran
20th-century Iranian people